Bruno Saltor Grau (born 1 October 1980), known simply as Bruno, is a Spanish football coach and former player who played as a right-back.

He began his professional career with Espanyol, and went on to appear in 128 La Liga matches, all but one of which were with Almería and Valencia. In 2012 he signed with Brighton & Hove Albion, going on to spend seven years with the English club and also acting as its captain.

Playing career

Spain
Born in El Masnou, Barcelona, Catalonia, Bruno was a product of RCD Espanyol's youth system. He appeared only once for the first team, playing eight minutes in a 3–1 home win over Rayo Vallecano on 29 September 2001; he was used almost exclusively by the B-side during his tenure, spending three of his four years in Segunda División B.

After a further two stints in his native region, with Gimnàstic de Tarragona (loan) and UE Lleida, Bruno joined UD Almería in the summer of 2006, being instrumental in the Andalusia side's first ever promotion to La Liga as a late bloomer. In 2007–08, he missed only four league games as his team overachieved for a final eighth place, and produced similar numbers in the following season.

In mid-June 2009, Bruno signed a three-year deal with Valencia CF and reunited with former Almería manager Unai Emery. He had previously arranged a transfer to Real Betis, but the move collapsed as the club was eventually relegated.

Brighton & Hove Albion

On 25 June 2012, after a further 33 league appearances for Valencia in two seasons combined, free agent Bruno signed a two-year contract for EFL Championship club Brighton & Hove Albion. He scored his first goal for his new team on 24 November, in a 1–1 draw at home to Bolton Wanderers.

At the age of 35/36, Bruno was still the automatic first choice in his position, helping the club gain promotion to the Premier League at the end of the 2016–17 campaign after 34 years. Previously, in March 2017, the captain agreed to a one-year contract extension, and on 20 April he was included in the Championship Team of the Year for the second year running.

Bruno made his debut in the English top flight on 12 August 2017, playing the whole of a 2–0 home loss to Manchester City. On 3 April 2018, he signed a new one-year deal. Two weeks later, he made his first league start since January, at home to Tottenham Hotspur in a 1–1 draw that gave his team "a big point" in their fight against relegation, and remained in the side for the 1–0 home win against Manchester United that ensured their safety, to which the player contributed with 25 appearances (26 overall).

A hamstring injury during the opening match of 2018–19 lost Bruno his place to fellow Spaniard Martín Montoya. Despite his return to the side in early October coinciding with three consecutive winning clean sheets, it proved short-lived. He played in the early rounds of the 2018–19 FA Cup, but not in the quarter-final or semi-final, and started five of the last six league matches as Brighton narrowly avoided relegation.

On 10 May 2019, Bruno announced his retirement at the end of the season. He started the 4–1 defeat at home to Manchester City that confirmed their second consecutive Premier League title, and ended his post-match speech of appreciation and farewell with the words "Once a Seagull, always a Seagull".

Coaching career
In June 2019, Bruno was appointed as a senior player development coach at his former club Brighton & Hove Albion.

On 8 September 2022, Bruno followed Graham Potter on a move to Chelsea.

Career statistics

Honours
Lleida
Segunda División B: 2003–04

Brighton & Hove Albion
EFL Championship runner-up: 2016–17

Individual
The Football League Team of the Season: 2015–16
PFA Team of the Year: 2015–16 Championship, 2016–17 Championship

Notes

References

External links
CiberChe biography and stats 

1980 births
Living people
People from El Masnou
Sportspeople from the Province of Barcelona
Spanish footballers
Footballers from Catalonia
Association football defenders
La Liga players
Segunda División players
Segunda División B players
RCD Espanyol B footballers
RCD Espanyol footballers
Gimnàstic de Tarragona footballers
UE Lleida players
UD Almería players
Valencia CF players
Premier League players
English Football League players
Brighton & Hove Albion F.C. non-playing staff
Brighton & Hove Albion F.C. players
Catalonia international footballers
Spanish expatriate footballers
Expatriate footballers in England
Spanish expatriate sportspeople in England
Chelsea F.C. non-playing staff